The bus service from London, England to Calcutta, India (now Kolkata) is considered to be the longest bus route in the world. The service, which was started in 1957, was routed to India via Belgium, Yugoslavia and North Western India. This route is also known as the Hippie Route. According to the reports, it took about 50 days for the bus to reach Calcutta from London. The voyage was over 10,000 miles (16,100 km) one way and 32669 km (20300 miles) for the round trip. It was in service until 1976. The cost of the trip one-way was £85 in 1957 and £145 in 1973. This amount includes food, travel and accommodation.

Route
The bus service was operated by Albert Travel. The maiden travel began in London on April 15, 1957. The first service ended on June 5 in Kolkata. That is, it takes about 50 days to complete the journey. The countries the bus traveled during its journey: from England to Belgium, and from there to India via West Germany, Austria, Yugoslavia, Bulgaria, Turkey, Iran, Afghanistan, Pakistan and North Western India. After entering India, it eventually reached Calcutta via New Delhi, Agra, Allahabad and Banaras.

Facilities on the bus
The trip was equipped with reading facilities, separate sleeping bunks for everyone, and fan-operated heaters. There was a kitchen with all equipment and amenities. There was a forward observation lounge on the upper deck of the bus. The trip was more like a tour than just a trip. The bus provided radio and a music system for parties.  It had time to spend at major tourist destinations along the way, including Banaras and the Taj Mahal on the banks of the Yamuna. Shopping was also allowed in Tehran, Salzburg, Kabul, Istanbul and Vienna.

Later history

After some years the bus met with an accident and became unusable. Later the bus was purchased by Andy Stewart, a British traveler. He rebuilt it to be a double-decker mobile home, which marked the beginning of the bus's next journey. The double-decker was renamed as Albert and was traveled from Sydney to London via India on October 8, 1968. It took about 132 days for the bus to reach London. Albert Tours was a company based in England and Australia and it operated on London–Calcutta–London and London–Calcutta–Sydney routes.

The bus reached India through Iran and then it traveled to Singapore through Burma, Thailand and Malaysia. From Singapore, the bus was transported to Perth in Australia by ship, and from there it traveled by road to Sydney. The charge for this service from London to Calcutta was £145. The service had all the modern facilities as before. The bus service was discontinued in 1976 due to the problems in Iran and the escalation of tensions between Pakistan and India. It is reported that the Albert Tours completed about 15 trips between Kolkata to London and again from London to Sydney, before the service ended permanently.

References

International bus transport
1957 establishments
1976 disestablishments
Bus transport in India